Krilatica is a village in the municipality of Kratovo, North Macedonia.

Demographics
According to the 2002 census, the village had a total of 141 inhabitants. The ethnic population of the village composes 140 Macedonians and one person listed as an "other".

References

Villages in Kratovo Municipality